Gaya district is one of the thirty-eight districts of the Indian state of Bihar. It was officially established on 3 October 1865. The district has a common boundary with the state of Jharkhand to the south. Gaya city is both the district headquarters and the second-largest city in Bihar.

History
Gaya finds mention in the great epics, Ramayana and Mahabharata. Ram along with Sita and Lakshman visited Gaya for offering Pind-Daan to their father Dasharath. In Mahabharata, the place has been identified as Gayapuri. About the origin of the name ‘Gaya' as referred to in Vayu Purana is that Gaya was the name of a demon (Asura) whose body was pious after he performed rigid penance and secured blessings from Vishnu. It was said that the Gayasura's body would continue to be known as Gaya Kshetra.

Gaya has experienced the rise and fall of many dynasties in the Magadh Region. From the 6th century BC to the 18th century AD, about 2300–2400 years, Gaya has been occupying an important place in the cultural history of the region. It opened up with the Shaishunaga dynasty founded by Shishunaga, who exercised power over Patna and Gaya around 600 BC. Bimbisara, fifth in line, who lived and ruled around 519 BC, had projected Gaya to the outer world. Having attained an important place in the history of civilisation, the area experienced the bliss of Gautam Buddha and Bhagwan Mahavir during the reign of Bimbisara. After a short spell of Nanda dynasty, Gaya and the entire Magadha region came under the Mauryan rule with Ashoka (272 BC – 232 BC) embracing Buddhism. He visited Gaya and built the first temple at Bodh Gaya to commemorate Prince Gautama's attainment of supreme enlightenment.

The period of Hindu revivalism commenced with the coming of the Guptas during the 4th and 5th century A.D. Samudragupta of Magadh helped to bring Gaya in limelight. It was the headquarters of Behar district during the Gupta empire.

Gaya then passed on to the Pala Empire with Gopala as the ruler. It is believed that the present temple of Bodh Gaya was built during the reign of Dharmapala, son of Gopala.

Gaya was in the 12th century invaded by Muhammad Bakhtiyar Khilji. But the Hindu rulers defeated his generals later. The place finally passed on to the Britishers after the battle of Buxar in 1764. Gaya district, along with other parts of the country, won freedom in 1947. Gaya is also the birthplace of eminent  nationalist & the first Deputy Chief Minister of Bihar Dr. Anugrah Narain Sinha.

Gaya formed a part of the district of Behar and Ramgarh till 1864. It was given the status of independent district in 1865. Subsequently, in May 1981, Magadh Division was created by the Bihar State Government with the districts of Gaya, Nawada, Aurangabad and Jehanabad. All these districts were at the level of sub-division when the Gaya district was created in 1865.

Gaya has seen three districts partitioned off from its territory: Aurangabad and Nawada in 1976, and Jehanabad in 1988.

It is currently a part of the Red Corridor.

Geography

Headquarters: Gaya
Area:Total 4,976 km2 Rural: 4891.48 Urban: 84.52
Temperature: minimum 0.8 (2002 AD) degree C – maximum 49.8 (1996) degree C
Rivers: Falgu

Politics 
  

|}

Economy
In 2006 the Ministry of Panchayati Raj named Gaya one of the country's 250 poorest districts (out of a total of 640). It is one of the 36 districts in Bihar currently receiving funds from the Backward Regions Grant Fund Programme (BRGF).

Divisions

Sub Divisions
Gaya District comprises 4 Sub-divisions:
 Gaya Sadar
 Tekari
 Neemchak Bathani
 Sherghati

Blocks 
Gaya district consists of 24 Blocks. The following are the list of the Blocks in Gaya district:

Flora and fauna

Demographics

According to the 2011 census Gaya district has a population of 4,391,418, roughly equal to the nation of Moldova or the US state of Kentucky. This gives it a ranking of 42nd in India (out of a total of 640). Its population growth rate over the decade 2001–2011 was 26.08%. Gaya has a sex ratio of 932 females for every 1,000 males, and a literacy rate of 66.35%. 13.24% of the population lives in urban areas. Scheduled Castes and Scheduled Tribes make up 30.39% and 0.07% of the population respectively.

At the time of the 2011 Census of India, 51.36% of the population in the district spoke Hindi, 41.37% Magahi and 7.04% Urdu as their first language.

Education

Schools in Gaya are either government run schools or private schools. Schools mainly use Hindi or English as the medium of instruction. The schools are affiliated with the Bihar School Examination Board, the Central Board of Secondary Education (CBSE) or the National Institute of Open Schooling (NIOS). Under the 10+2+3/4 plan, after completing their secondary education, students typically enroll in a school with a higher secondary facility affiliated with the BSEB, the NIOS or the CBSE. Students usually choose from one of three streams — liberal arts, commerce, or science, though vocational streams are also available. Upon completing the required coursework, students may enroll in general or professional degree programmed.

See also

 List of districts of Bihar
 Nawada
 Gaya
 Patna
 Begusarai
 Lakhisarai

References

External links	
	
Official Website of district
 Gaya Information Portal

 
Magadh division
Districts of Bihar
1865 establishments in India